The Venova is a single-reeded woodwind musical instrument, currently produced by the Yamaha Corporation. The original model, the YVS-100, was released in 2017 and an alto model, the YVS-120, was released in 2019.

The Venova features a predominantly cylindrical bore, but is distinguished by its branched-pipe structure near the mouthpiece of the instrument. Reportedly, this serves to approximate the acoustic qualities of an instrument with a conical bore, such as a saxophone. The body of the Venova is composed almost entirely of ABS resin, and utilizes fingering systems derived from Baroque and German recorder convention to chromatically span two octaves in the key of C (in the case of the YVS-100). As such, Yamaha markets this instrument as a "casual woodwind instrument".

The Venova received "Good Design Award", the highest award, at the 2017 Good Design Awards.

See also
Chalumeau
Xaphoon

References

External links
 
Product page, Yamaha

Single-reed instruments